Celestino Vercelli (10 August 1946 – 26 November 2020) was an Italian professional racing cyclist. He rode in the 1971 and 1976 Tour de France as well as in seven editions of the Giro d'Italia and the 1970 Vuelta a España.

Major results
1970
 7th Trofeo Baracchi (with Adriano Pella)
 10th Giro di Toscana
1971
 5th Coppa Bernocchi
 7th Giro del Piemonte
1972
 5th Giro del Veneto
 6th Giro dell'Umbria
 7th Gran Premio Industria e Commercio di Prato
1975
 2nd Coppa Sabatini
 7th GP Montelupo
1976
 3rd Overall Cronostaffetta

Grand Tour general classification results timeline

References

External links
 

1946 births
2020 deaths
Italian male cyclists
Sportspeople from the Province of Novara
Cyclists from Piedmont